Blarney is a town and townland in County Cork, Ireland.

Blarney may also refer to:

 Blarney (film), a 1926 American silent film 
 2320 Blarney, a main-belt asteroid
 Blarney (code name), an American communications surveillance program

See also

 Blarney Castle, in Blarney
 Blarney Stone, a legendary stone at Blarney Castle
 Blarney United F.C., Irish amateur football club